O'Briens Hill is a rural locality in the Cassowary Coast Region, Queensland, Australia.

History 
The locality was named after a pioneer family in the area.

References 

Cassowary Coast Region
Localities in Queensland